Elvio Porta (22 May 1945 – 26 December 2016) was an Italian actor, film director, and screenwriter. He won three Silver Ribbons over the course of his career. Four years later, Porta and Nanni Loy shared the Silver Ribbon for Best Screenplay for Where's Picone?

Porta died in 2016, aged 71.

Selected filmography
The Payoff (1978)
Neapolitan Mystery (1979)
Café Express (1980)
Where's Picone? (1983)
Camorra (1986; also appeared as actor)
What if Gargiulo Finds Out? (1988; also directed)
Scugnizzi (1989)
Too Much Romance... It's Time for Stuffed Peppers (2004)

References

External links

1945 births
2016 deaths
Male actors from Naples
Italian male film actors
20th-century Italian male actors
Italian film directors
Italian screenwriters
Italian male screenwriters